The Frozen Tundra Hockey Classic was a college ice hockey game played on a makeshift ice rink covering the field at Lambeau Field in Green Bay, Wisconsin. The game was the second outdoor game involving US college teams, the first being "The Cold War".

The matchup pitted the men's ice hockey programs from the visiting Ohio State University Buckeyes and the host University of Wisconsin–Madison Badgers. At the time, Ohio State represented the now-defunct CCHA while Wisconsin was a member of the WCHA. Both programs now compete in the Big Ten Conference.

Sources

Outdoor ice hockey games
2005–06 NCAA Division I men's ice hockey season
Ohio State Buckeyes men's ice hockey
Wisconsin Badgers men's ice hockey
2006 in sports in Wisconsin